{{DISPLAYTITLE:θ10}}
In representation theory, a branch of mathematics, θ10 is a cuspidal unipotent complex irreducible representation of the symplectic group Sp4 over a finite, local, or global field.

 introduced θ10 for the symplectic group Sp4(Fq) over a finite field Fq of order q, and showed that in this case it is
q(q – 1)2/2-dimensional. The subscript 10 in  θ10 is a historical accident that has stuck: Srinivasan  arbitrarily named  some of the characters of  Sp4(Fq) as  θ1, θ2, ..., θ13, and the tenth one in her list happens to be the cuspidal unipotent character.

θ10 is the only cuspidal unipotent representation of Sp4(Fq). It is the simplest example of a cuspidal unipotent representation of a reductive group, and also the simplest example of a degenerate cuspidal representation (one without a Whittaker model).
General linear groups have no cuspidal unipotent representations and no degenerate cuspidal representations, so θ10 exhibits properties of general reductive groups  that do not occur for general linear groups.

 used the representations  θ10 over local and global fields in their construction of counterexamples to the generalized Ramanujan conjecture for the symplectic group.  described the representation θ10 of the Lie group Sp4(R) over the local field R in detail.

References

.

Representation theory
Automorphic forms